The Sikh gurus (Punjabi: ਸਿੱਖ ਗੁਰੂ; Devanagari: सिख गुरु) are the spiritual masters of Sikhism, who established this religion over the course of about two and a half centuries, beginning in 1469. The year 1469 marks the birth of Guru Nanak, the founder of Sikhism. He was succeeded by nine other human gurus until, in 1708, the Guruship was finally passed on by the tenth guru to the holy Sikh scripture, Guru Granth Sahib, which is now considered the living Guru by the followers of the Sikh faith.

Etymology and definition

Guru (Punjabi: ਗੁਰੂ, IAST: guru) is a Sanskrit term for a "teacher, guide, expert, or master" of certain knowledge or field. Bhai Vir Singh, in his dictionary of Guru Granth Sahib describes the term Guru as a combination of two separate units: "Gu;(ਗੁ)" meaning darkness and "Rū;(ਰੂ)" which means light. Hence, Guru is who brings light into darkness or in other words, the one who enlightens.

Bhai Vir Singh's definition provides further insight about Sikhi itself and explains why Guru Granth Sahib is considered the living Guru. The word Sikh is derived from the Sanskrit term shishya(Punjabi: ਸਿੱਖ) which means a disciple or a student. Thus, Sikhs have a student–teacher relationship with their Gurus since their teachings, written in Guru Granth Sahib, serve as a guide for the Sikhs.

The gurus

Timeline

Pedigrees

See also

 History of Sikhism
 Khalsa
 Gurgadi
 Gurpurab
 Joti Jot

Notes

References